Nand Lal Noorpuri (June 1906 – 13 May 1966) was an Indian poet, writer and lyricist who wrote in Punjabi. He wrote lyrics for many films including Mangti (1942 film). He committed suicide on May 13, 1966.

Early life 
Nand Lal Noorpuri was born in June 1906, to father Bishan Singh and mother Hukman Devi, in the Noor Pur 122 JB Faisalabad village of Lyallpur district in British Punjab. He studied at Khalsa High School and at the old Khalsa College in Lyallpur (renamed as Faisalabad in Pakistan after partition in 1947). He quit college and joined first as a teacher and then as an assistant sub-inspector in Bikaner in Rajasthan where he received a bravery award. He married  Sumittra Devi and the couple was blessed with four daughters and two sons. After partition, in 1947, he settled in Jalandhar.

Career 
In 1940, he left police force and came back to Punjab and wrote lyrics for Punjabi film Mangti. that made him known to everyone in Punjab. But the partition changed everything for him. The source of income dried up. He lost his home and livelihood and came to Jalandhar. Later, he found work in radio and started participating in kavi darbars (English: poetic concerts). His songs sung by many notable singers of Punjab including Mohammad Rafi, Surinder Kaur, Narinder Biba, Asa Singh Mastana, Parkash Kaur, A.S. Kang and more.

Death 
Disillusioned with his own poverty and lack of support and recognition from the government, he committed suicide on 13 May  1966, by jumping into the well near his house in Model House Block-A colony, Jalandhar.

Nand Lal Noorpuri Society 
Some years back, some poets and journalists formed the Nand Lal Noorpuri Society with the aim to spread the poet's work. Currently, it has the only annual award it gives to singers and poets. Sarbjit Cheema is the recent one to receive this award for his song on girl foeticide.

See also 
Shiv Kumar Batalvi
Bari Nizami

References 

Punjabi-language poets
Punjabi-language lyricists
Punjabi-language writers
1906 births
1966 deaths
20th-century Indian poets
Indian male poets
20th-century Indian male writers
People from Faisalabad
Poets from Punjab, India
People from Jalandhar
1966 suicides
Suicides by jumping in India